= Biskopsön =

Island in Värmdö municipality, Sweden

Coordinates: 59°6′10″N 18°43′27″E

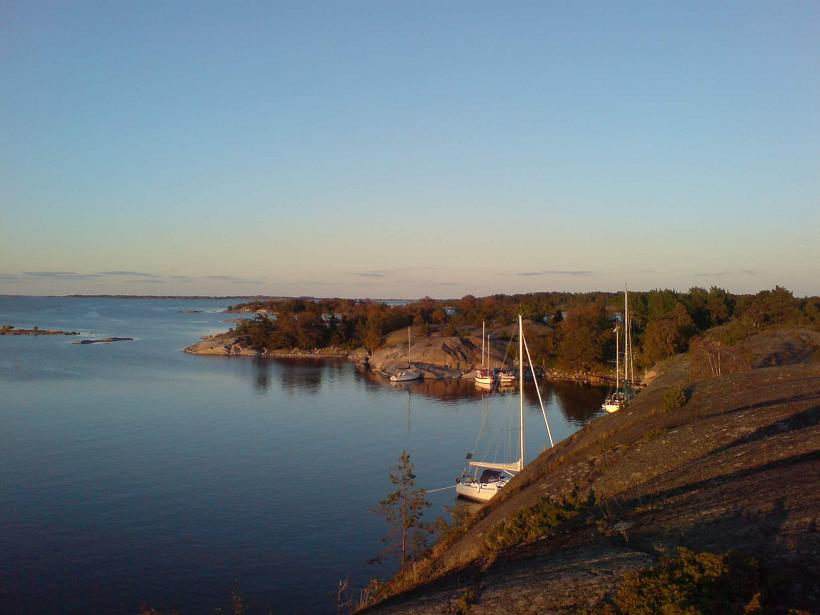
View of the Biskopsön Island

Biskopsön (Bishop Island) is an island in the archipelago of Stockholm, Sweden. Nearby islands in the same region of the archipelago include Kastön and Svärtskär.

== History ==
According to August Strindberg, the Swedish author, the local people at his time told him that the island had been given its name because a bishop (Swedish: Biskop) had been murdered there.
